Mountain Jews in Israel, also known as the Juhurim, refers to immigrants and descendants of the immigrants of the Mountain Jewish communities, who now reside within the state of Israel. Mountain Jews descent in Israel are considered part of the Mizrahim.

History
Even before the advent of Zionism, the Juhurim had a desire to return to Zion, which many did in the 1840s and 1850s.

First wave of emigration: 1881–1947
Mountain Jews were among the first to make Aliyah, with some immigrating independent of the Zionist movement, while others came inspired by it. They were represented at the Zionist congresses and the first Mountain Jewish settlers in Ottoman Syria established the modern Israeli town of Be'er Ya'akov in 1907. In the early 1920s, Baku became one of the centres of the Jewish national movement, and Zionist newspapers were published in Juhuri.

1948–1970s
The Mountain Jews living in the Soviet Union celebrated the creation of the State of Israel loudly and proudly, which led to repression by Soviet authorities. Many were arrested and imprisoned for engaging in "anti-Soviet propaganda." The Six-Day War resulted in an eruption of Jewish patriotism among Mountain Jews, although the broader Zionist awakening didn't take place until the early 1970s. It was then when over 10,000 Mountain Jews (about a quarter of the population) emigrated to Israel.

1990s–present
Following the dissolution of the Soviet Union, thousands of Mountain Jews moved to Israel. During the First Chechen War, some left due to the violence. Despite the usual close relations between Jews and Chechens, many were kidnapped by Chechen gangs who ransomed their freedom to "the international Jewish community."

Notable people
Yekutiel Adam
Udi Adam
Yafa Yarkoni
Sarit Hadad
Lior Refaelov
Omer Adam
Astrix
Eli Babayev
Albert Solomonov

See also
 Mountain Jews
 Aliyah
 Iranian Jews in Israel
 Georgian Jews in Israel
 1970s Soviet Union aliyah
 1990s Post-Soviet aliyah
 Azerbaijan–Israel relations

Sources

 

Israeli people of Caucasus descent
 
Israeli Jews by region
Azerbaijan–Israel relations